Marilyn Kaye Kirkpatrick (born March 11, 1967) is an American politician. She is the chairwoman of the Clark County Commission. She was a member of the Nevada Assembly, representing Clark County District 1 from 2004 to 2015. She is a member of the Democratic Party.

See also
 List of female speakers of legislatures in the United States

External links
 Nevada Assembly - Marilyn Kirkpatrick Official government website
 Project Vote Smart - Representative Marilyn Kirkpatrick (NV) profile
 Elect Marilyn Kirkpatrick - campaign website
 Follow the Money - Marilyn Kirkpatrick
 2004 2006 campaign contributions

1967 births
Living people
Politicians from Carson City, Nevada
Politicians from Las Vegas
Speakers of the Nevada Assembly
Democratic Party members of the Nevada Assembly
Women state legislators in Nevada
21st-century American women